Lee Kwang-ki (born 13 October 1993) is a South Korean snowboarder. He has competed at the 2014 Winter Olympics in Sochi.

References

1993 births
Snowboarders at the 2014 Winter Olympics
Snowboarders at the 2018 Winter Olympics
Living people
Olympic snowboarders of South Korea
South Korean male snowboarders
Snowboarders at the 2017 Asian Winter Games
21st-century South Korean people